Jeffrey "Jeff" Powers (born January 21, 1980) is an American water polo player. He was an All-American at the University of California, Irvine. He played for the United States national team at the 2004, 2008, and 2012 Summer Olympics, helping the team win the silver medal in 2008.

Career

High school
Powers attended San Luis Obispo High School, where he played on the water polo team. He was named to the All-CIF team twice.

College
Powers played on the UC Irvine water polo team. He was a first team All-American in 2000, 2001, and 2002.

International
Powers scored four goals at the 2001 FINA World Championships. He scored six goals, tied for the team lead, at the 2002 FINA World Cup. At the 2003 Pan American Games, he had a hat trick in the gold medal game, which the U.S. won. He played at the 2004 Summer Olympics, and the U.S. finished seventh.

Powers scored 10 goals at the 2005 FINA World Championships. The U.S. won the 2007 Pan American Games, and Powers scored seven goals. At the 2008 Summer Olympics, he scored six goals and helped the U.S. win the silver medal.

Powers scored five goals at both the 2009 FINA World Championships and the 2010 FINA World Cup. The U.S. won the 2011 Pan American Games, and Powers led the team with 11 goals. He scored five times at the 2012 Summer Olympics, and the U.S. finished in eighth place.

Professional
From 2004 to 2011, Powers played professionally in Greece, Italy, and Hungary: Vasas-Plaket TeVa.

Awards
In 2019, Powers was inducted into the USA Water Polo Hall of Fame.

Personal
Powers was born in on January 21, 1980. He is 6 feet, 7 inches tall. He lives in San Luis Obispo, California.

Powers' brother Steve played water polo for Purdue University. Powers is currently the head coach of swimming and water polo at St. John Bosco High School (Bellflower, CA)

See also
 List of Olympic medalists in water polo (men)

References

External links
 

1980 births
Living people
People from Chattanooga, Tennessee
Sportspeople from Tennessee
American male water polo players
Water polo centre backs
UC Irvine Anteaters men's water polo players
Water polo players at the 2004 Summer Olympics
Water polo players at the 2008 Summer Olympics
Water polo players at the 2012 Summer Olympics
Medalists at the 2008 Summer Olympics
Olympic silver medalists for the United States in water polo
Water polo players at the 2007 Pan American Games
Water polo players at the 2011 Pan American Games
Pan American Games medalists in water polo
Pan American Games gold medalists for the United States
American water polo coaches
Medalists at the 2011 Pan American Games
21st-century American people